The Big Guy and Rusty the Boy Robot is a 1995 comic book written by Frank Miller, drawn by Geof Darrow and published by Dark Horse Comics. The comic book was adapted into an animated TV series of the same name.

Overview
After appearing in various comic book pin-up and poster pages, the Big Guy first appeared without Rusty in issues #6 and 7 of Mike Allred's Madman Comics, which was part of Dark Horse Comics' now defunct Legend imprint.

The property graduated to its own series, a large format two-issue mini-series in 1995, written by Frank Miller and illustrated by Geof Darrow. The story revolves around an attack on Tokyo by a giant reptilian creature that is originated in an experiment gone wrong, and the failure of the newly commissioned Rusty the Boy Robot to stop the threat. Subsequently, Japan requested help from the U.S. Armed Forces, whose ultimate defense, the robot Big Guy, launches from his air carrier base and uses his awesome arsenal and good old-fashioned American know-how to save the day.
 
Big Guy also makes an appearance in Frank Miller and Dave Gibbons' Martha Washington Stranded in Space and cameo appearances in the last Sin City book, Sin City: Hell and Back.

See also
 Big Guy and Rusty the Boy Robot (TV series)

References

External links
Comic book DB page

Child superheroes
Fictional robots
Child characters in comics
Comic strip duos
Dark Horse Comics titles
1995 comics debuts
Superhero comics
Comics characters introduced in 1995
Comics by Frank Miller (comics)
Comics adapted into television series
Comics adapted into animated series